The Architects & Building Branch (1949–present) was formed in the wake of World War II. The UK Government decided that there was a need to centralise the construction of school buildings in order to save money and improve standards., Rationing limited materials available and meant that a programme for rebuilding schools, and building new schools for the expanding population, had to be phased, and carefully managed. Formed by the merger of the Architects Branch and the Buildings and Priority Branch of the Ministry of Education, the department brought together both administrative personnel and professional architects into one multi-disciplinary team.

Structure 
The Branch began as a team of "territorial" architects. and was later split into two sections; the Territorial, and Development teams, headed by Stirrat Marshall-Johnson, and Anthony Pott respectively. The purpose of the Territorial team was to work with local authorities and private architects on the approval of school plans. Their work was often very technical, with some visits and involvement of educational advisors. The Development team investigated technical and educational matters and designed and built schools for local authorities. Effectively, the Development team were an action research body whose findings are used and applied by the Territorial architects. Their work was used for reference by the Branch and round the world, areas they investigated include buildings furniture and components, and publications. Investigations were not limited to the UK, visits were made to other countries including France, the Netherlands, and Germany.

Activity
The Branch designed and built around 30 educational buildings and schools during their period of operation. They were revolutionary in their consideration of the child as the most important client. The Branch commissioned some of the first measurements of school children in order to create spaces, and furniture designs that would aid children's learning. Every part of a school was designed by the Branch; ironmongery, light fittings, furniture, heating, outdoor play areas. Assistance from the relevant industries was sought and throughout its existence the department worked in close collaboration with Local Authorities and other organisations such as the Furniture Industry Research Association to ensure their work was suited to the purpose it intended. They also forged close links with HM Inspectorate of Schools.

Individuals
Significant individuals in the Branch include;
 Stirrat Marshall Johnson
 Anthony Part
 David Medd
 Mary Medd
 Tony Branton

Collections
The Photographic Archive of the Architects and Building Branch, Ministry of Education and its successors is held by the Institute of Education Archive.

The National Archives holds the  Records of the Architects and Building Branch of the Ministry of Education

Organizations established in 1949
Architecture organisations based in the United Kingdom